Culbertson is the name reformed from Culberson and Culbert:

In places:
 Culbertson, Montana
 Culbertson, Nebraska

In people:
 Culbertson (name)
 Ely Culbertson (1891-1955), American contract bridge player, author and promoter, often referred to simply by his surname
 Culbertson four-five notrump, a slam-seeking convention devised by Ely Culbertson
 Culbertson system, the earliest dominant bidding system in contract bridge, devised by Ely Culbertson

In other uses:
 Culbertson Mansion State Historic Site, in New Albany, Indiana, USA
 Culbertson's Path, in Pennsylvania, USA
 Cordelia A. Culbertson House, a registered historic location in Pasadena, California

See also 
 Culberson (disambiguation)